Walter Hennah (16 March 1880 – 13 August 1946) was an Australian cricketer. He played one first-class match for Western Australia in 1909/10.

See also
 List of Western Australia first-class cricketers

References

External links
 

1880 births
1946 deaths
Australian cricketers
Western Australia cricketers
Sportspeople from Ballarat